Wyandot County Courthouse is a historic courthouse in Upper Sandusky, Ohio. The building was designed by prominent Ohio architects Yost & Packard. It was added to the National Register of Historic Places, along with the neighboring jail, in 1973.

See also
 National Register of Historic Places listings in Wyandot County, Ohio

References

Buildings and structures in Wyandot County, Ohio
National Register of Historic Places in Wyandot County, Ohio
Clock towers in Ohio
County courthouses in Ohio
Government buildings completed in 1900
Government buildings completed in 1875
Courthouses on the National Register of Historic Places in Ohio
Yost and Packard buildings
Jails on the National Register of Historic Places in Ohio
Jails in Ohio